Lingyan Pavilion was a small tower beside Sanqing Hall in the southwest of Taiji Palace, Chang'an, the capital of the Tang dynasty. Its location in modern China is roughly in the north of Xi'an, Shaanxi.

The original 24
On 23 March 643, during the Zhenguan era of the reign of Emperor Taizong in the Tang dynasty, the emperor commissioned the artist Yan Liben to paint life-sized portraits of 24 officials to commemorate them for their meritorious service and contributions aiding him in his establishment of the Tang Empire. However, many among the 24 men were also instrumental in helping Taizong seize power during the Xuanwu Gate Incident.

The paintings were displayed in Lingyan Pavilion and all of them faced north. The pavilion was divided into three layers: the innermost held the portraits of chancellors; the middle displayed paintings of princes and dukes; the outermost for the remaining ones. Emperor Taizong often visited the pavilion to view the portraits and reminisce the past.

The 24 officials are listed as such:

After Taizong
Five Tang emperors after Taizong also honored officials whom they felt have contributed greatly to the empire, by hanging their portraits in Lingyan Pavilion. Such officials include Guo Ziyi (honored by Tang Daizong and Tang Dezong) and Li Guangbi (honored by Tang Suzong), who were vital in putting down the An Lushan Rebellion. In a twist of fate, Chu Suiliang, whose calligraphy was used when honoring the original 24, was posthumously inaugurated into Lingyan Pavilion by Tang Dezong, and again by Tang Xuanzong, Li Chen.

Some officials were commemorated by more than one emperor. Thus, while the final number of portraits hung in the pavilion was 132, only about 100 officials were honored.

However, some officials were inaugurated by emperors who seek to curry favor through such a move. This was due to the weakening of imperial authority after the An Lushan Rebellion. Such officials include enunchs like Yu Chaoen and Cheng Yuanzhen, and generals like Tian Chengsi who helped usher in the era of fanzhen which became largely autonomous and defied control by the imperial court.

See also
The 28 Generals of Yuntai

References 

 Old Book of Tang, vol. 77 .
 Zizhi Tongjian, vol. 196.

Tang dynasty paintings
643
History of Xi'an
7th century in China
Sets of portraits